The 2009 FIBA Europe Under-20 Championship was the 12th edition of the FIBA Europe Under-20 Championship. The cities of Rhodes and Ialysos, in Greece, hosted the tournament. Greece won their second title.

Israel and Belgium were relegated to Division B.

Teams

Venues

Preliminary round

Group A

Group B

Group C

Group D

Qualifying round

Group E

Group F

Knockout stage

Championship bracket

5th place bracket

9th place bracket

13th place bracket

Quarter Final Round

Classification round for 9th to 12th place

Semi-finals

Classification round for 5th to 8th place

Semi-finals

Finals

Final standings

Awards

All-Tournament Team

 Antoine Diot
 Kostas Papanikolaou
 Kevin Seraphin
 Nikola Vučević
 Xavier Rabaseda

Stats leaders

Points

Rebounds

Assists

External links
FIBA Europe
FIBA Archive

FIBA U20 European Championship
2009–10 in European basketball
2009–10 in Greek basketball
International youth basketball competitions hosted by Greece